The 2016 Queensland Cup season was the 21st season of Queensland's top-level statewide rugby league competition run by the Queensland Rugby League. The competition, known as the Intrust Super Cup due to sponsorship from Intrust Super, featured 14 teams playing a 29-week long season (including finals) from March to September.

The Burleigh Bears won their third premiership after defeating the Burleigh Bears 26–16 in the Grand Final at Suncorp Stadium. Mackay Cutters'  Josh Chudleigh was named the competition's Player of the Year, winning the Courier Mail Medal.

Teams
In 2016, the lineup of teams remained unchanged for the second consecutive year.

Ladder

Final series

Grand Final

Burleigh returned to the finals for the first time in 11 years after finishing the regular season in 2nd. After their first week bye, they defeated Redcliffe 40–24 in the major semi final to qualify for their fifth Grand Final, their first since 2005. Redcliffe finished the regular season as minor premiers and qualified for the finals for the first time since 2012. After losing to Burleigh in the major semi final, they defeated the Sunshine Coast in the preliminary final and booked a spot in their 10th Grand Final, their third against Burleigh.

First half
Burleigh got the scoring underway in the 12th minute when fullback Kurtis Rowe sliced through the Dolphins' defence and ran 35 metres to score. It took just four minutes for Redcliffe to hit back when winger Jonus Pearson scored following some slick offloading close to the line. In the 23rd minute, Rowe recorded his second try of the contest when he muscled his way over to extended Burleigh's lead to eight. A penalty goal converted from right in front pushed the Bears' lead to 10 before Redcliffe scored through Tyson Cleal to cut margin to four in the 33rd minute.

Second half
The Bears again scored the first points of the half, this time through centre Sami Sauiluma in the 49th minute. Halfback Jamal Fogarty converted the try from out wide to give Burleigh a 10-point lead. The Dolphins got back into the game in the 57th minute thanks to a try to halfback Darren Nicholls, as they trailed by just four points. In the 71st minute, the Bears sealed the win when five-eighth Cameron Cullen scored and gave his side an unassailable 10-point lead. The victory was Burleigh's third Grand Final triumph, making them the second most successful club in the competition. Cullen was awarded the Duncan Hall Medal for man of the match for his performance.

NRL State Championship

After winning the Grand Final, the Burleigh Bears qualified for the NRL State Championship on NRL Grand Final day. They were defeated by the Illawarra Cutters, the New South Wales Cup premiers, 54–12.

Player statistics
The following statistics are as of the conclusion of the season (including finals).

Leading try scorers

Leading point scorers

QRL awards
 Courier Mail Medal (Best and Fairest): Josh Chudleigh ( Mackay Cutters)
 Coach of the Year: Jim Lenihan ( Burleigh Bears)
 Rookie of the Year: Jonus Pearson ( Redcliffe Dolphins)
 Representative Player of the Year: Jai Arrow ( Queensland Residents,  Norths Devils)
 XXXX People's Choice Award: Justin Olam ( PNG Hunters)

Team of the Year

See also

 Queensland Cup
 Queensland Rugby League

References

2016 in Australian rugby league
Queensland Cup